The 1937 Australian Championships was a tennis tournament that took place on outdoor Grass courts at the White City Tennis Club, Sydney, Australia from 22 January to 1 February. It was the 30th edition of the Australian Championships (now known as the Australian Open), the 8th held in Sydney, and the first Grand Slam tournament of the year. The singles titles were won by Australians Vivian McGrath and Nancye Wynne.

Finals

Men's singles

 Vivian McGrath defeated  John Bromwich  6–3, 1–6, 6–0, 2–6, 6–1

Women's singles

 Nancye Wynne defeated  Emily Hood Westacott  6–3, 5–7, 6–4

Men's doubles

 Adrian Quist /  Don Turnbull defeated  John Bromwich /  Jack Harper 6–2, 9–7, 1–6, 6–8, 6–4

Women's doubles

 Thelma Coyne /  Nancye Wynne defeated  Nell Hall Hopman /  Emily Hood Westacott 6–2, 6–2

Mixed doubles

 Nell Hall Hopman /  Harry Hopman defeated  Dorothy Stevenson /  Don Turnbull 3–6, 6–3, 6–2

External links
 Australian Open official website

1937 in tennis
1937
 
January 1937 sports events
 
February 1937 sports events